V. R. Ramanatha Iyer served as mayor of Madras.

References 

Mayors of Chennai
Year of birth missing
Year of death missing